JMAG is a simulation software used for the development and design of electrical devices. JMAG was originally released in 1983 as a tool to support the design of devices such as motors, actuators, circuit components, and antennas.

JMAG incorporates simulation technology to accurately analyze a wide range of physical phenomenon that includes complicated geometry, various material properties, and the heat and structure at the center of electromagnetic fields. JMAG has an interface capable of linking to third-party software and a portion of the JMAG analysis functions can also be executed from many of the major CAD and CAE systems.

JMAG is actively used to analyze designs at a system level that includes drive circuits by utilizing links to power electronic simulators. Engineers use JMAG for the development of drive motors for electric vehicles.

History
1983 – JMAG Version 1 was developed as 3D static magnetic field analysis software.
1986 – JMAG DYN was developed as 3D transient magnetic field analysis software.
1994 – JMAG-Works was developed as integrated electromagnetic analysis software with thermal analysis solutions.
1998 – JMAG-Studio was developed as an integrated electromagnetic analysis software native to Windows.
2000 – Coupled analyses were implemented for control solutions.
2002 – JMAG-Designer was developed as an add-on for SolidWorks.
2004 – JMAG RT-Solutions was developed for model based development of motor drive systems.
2007 – JMAG Motor Template 2 was developed for creating motor templates by specifying basic parameters such as the geometry and the windings.
2009 – JMAG Motor Bench and JMAG Transformer Design and Evaluation tools were developed for improving the manufacturing of devices.
2018 – JMAG-Express Online was developed for designing and evaluating motor on web browser.

See also
Computer-aided engineering
Finite element analysis
List of finite element software packages

External links
 jmag-international.com, official website

References
 Serec Newsletter, Swiss Research & Engineering Centre, March 9, 2009
 Development of an Electromagnet Energy Storage System, Te-Chin Wei, Department of Electrical and Computer Engineering, University of Auckland
 JMAG Application Catalog
 JMAG-Express Online

Simulation software
Finite element software
Finite element software for Linux
Sumitomo Mitsui Financial Group
1983 software